The 2018–19 Sudan Premier League is the 48th season of the Sudan Premier League, the top-tier football league in Sudan. The season started on 22 November 2018.

First stage

Group A

Group B

Championship playoff

Relegation playoff

References

Sudan Premier League seasons
football
football
Sudan